Bilsey Hill is a  geological Site of Special Scientific Interest south of Blakeney in Norfolk. It is a Geological Conservation Review site and it is in the Norfolk Coast Area of Outstanding Natural Beauty.

The site is private land with no public access.

References

Sites of Special Scientific Interest in Norfolk
Geological Conservation Review sites